Jogi Ramesh is an Indian politician from the state of Andhra Pradesh.  He is elected as the Member of the Legislative Assembly (MLA) from Pedana Constituency in 2019 and on 11 April 2022 sworn in as the Minister in the Jagan 2.0 cabinet.

Early life
Jogi Ramesh was born in 1970 in Ibrahimpatnam, Krishna district (now NTR district) to Jogi Mohan Rao and Pushpavati. He has completed BSc from National College, Acharya Nagarjuna University in 1989. Jogi Ramesh was a member of the Gowda community and was at the forefront of the movement for the development of the BCs in the district.

Political career
Jogi Ramesh was active in politics in the Youth Congress wing from college days. He served as the President of Krishna district Youth Congress, Railway Board member, Satavahana RTC regional zonal chairman. Jogi Ramesh contested as a Congress candidate from Pedana in 2009 Andhra Pradesh Assembly elections and won against the Telugu Desam Party candidate Kagitha Venkat Rao for the first time as an MLA with a majority of 1,192 votes. He later joined the YSR Congress Party in 2013, and served as the State Spokesperson for the Party. He contested 2014 Assembly Elections from Mylavaram from YSRCP and lost to Telugu Desam Party candidate Devineni Uma Maheswara Rao. In 2019 Assembly Elections he contested again from Pedana as YSRCP candidate and defeated TDP candidate Kagitha Krishna Prasad by a majority of 7,839 votes. Jogi Ramesh was inducted into Y.S. Jagan Mohan Reddy’s Cabinet on 11 April 2022.

References

Living people
YSR Congress Party politicians
Indian National Congress politicians from Andhra Pradesh
People from Krishna district
Andhra Pradesh MLAs 2009–2014
Andhra Pradesh MLAs 2019–2024
1970 births